Entre rojas is a 1995 Spanish drama directed by  in her feature film directorial debut. It stars Penélope Cruz, Cristina Marcos and María Pujalte.

Plot 

Cast

Accolades 

|-
| rowspan = "2" align = "center" | 1996 || 5th Actors Union Awards || Best Newcomer || María Pujalte ||  || align = "center" | 
|-
| 10th Goya Awards || Best New Actress || María Pujalte ||  || align = "center" | 
|}

See also 
 List of Spanish films of 1995

References

Bibliography

External links
 

1995 films
1995 drama films
1990s Spanish-language films
Spanish drama films
1990s Spanish films
1990s prison films
Spanish prison films
Films set in Madrid
Films set in 1974
Women in prison films
1995 directorial debut films